Jan Stefan Attefall (born 21 August 1960, in Lycksele, Västerbotten County) is a Swedish politician who served as Minister for Public Administration and Minister for Housing from 2010 to 2014. He is a member of the Christian Democrats.

Biography 
Attefall has a bachelor's degree in political science and economics from Umeå University. He is the son of the boat builder Konrad Lindström and adopted mother Solveig's Attefall. His brother Anders Sellström is also a Christian Democratic politician. Attefall joined KDS in his teens and soon received political assignments. 

Attefall was union chairman of the Christian Democratic Youth Union 1986–1989. Attefall was Member of the Riksdag from 1991 to 1994 and from 1998 to 2014. In the Riksdag, Attefall served as parliamentary group leader of his party from 2002 to 2010 and as chairman of the Committee on Finance from 2006 to 2010.

His name is associated with the Attefall house, a larger version of the friggebod.

Elected chairman of RIO (Rörelsefolkhögskolornas intresseorganisation) in 2017.

Private life 
Attefall married the psychologist Karin Hansson (born 1958) in 1986, later divorced, married for the second time in 1996 to the journalist Cecilia Hjorth Attefall (born 1967), who is chairman of Erikshjälpen and chairman of the senior citizens' committee in Jönköping Municipality. They have three children together, a son and two daughters. The family lives in Jönköping.

References

1960 births
Living people
Umeå University alumni
Members of the Riksdag from the Christian Democrats (Sweden)
Members of the Riksdag 1991–1994
Members of the Riksdag 1998–2002
Members of the Riksdag 2002–2006
Members of the Riksdag 2006–2010
Members of the Riksdag 2010–2014
Swedish Ministers for Housing